Giuseppe Ricci  (1853 in Genoa – April 21, 1901 in Turin) was an Italian painter, often painting indoor genre themes.

Biography
While he was born and a resident of Genoa, he had trained first in Turin with Enrico Gamba and then in Paris with Léon Bonnat. In 1880, he exhibited Bozzeto di mendicante. In 1892, the Civic Museum of Turin acquired Una lezione di musica (The Music Lesson). In 1900, he painted Voci Intime (Intimate Voices);  Madonna del Fiore (won Alinari Prize); and Le pain be'nit (1900). He was strongly influenced by the French painter Eugène Carrière. Giuseppe Pasquale Ricci, who bears no known relationship, was a merchant of the city of Trieste.

In 1880 at the Exhibition of Turin, he displayed:Buon viaggio; and in 1884, Diogene and In processione. In 1883 at the Exhibition of Rome, he exhibited Per la processione. In 1880, at the Fine Arts Exhibition of Milan, he displayed the realist style painting of Mendicante (Beggar).

References

1853 births
1901 deaths
19th-century Italian painters
Italian male painters
20th-century Italian painters
Painters from Genoa
Italian genre painters
19th-century Italian male artists
20th-century Italian male artists